Arctia  is species of tiger moth in the family Erebidae. It was first described by Carl Linnaeus in his 1758 10th edition of Systema Naturae. It can be found in central and eastern Europe, Kazakhstan, southern Siberia, northern Mongolia, Amur Region, Primorye, Sakhalin, Kunashir, northern and northeastern China, Korea and Japan.

The larvae feed on Lonicera, Hieracium, Vaccinium, Fraxinus, Corylus, Quercus species and Prunus padus.

This species was moved to Arctia as a result of phylogenetic research published by Rönkä et al. in 2016.

References

 , 2004: On a distribution of Pericallia matronula L. (Lepidoptera, Arctiidae), with description of a new subspecies, based on the male genitalia structure. Tinea 18 (3): 220–229.

External links

Pericallia matronula on Fauna Europaea

Arctiina
Monotypic moth genera
Moths of Asia
Moths of Europe
Moths described in 1758
Taxa named by Carl Linnaeus